The Torresian kingfisher (Todiramphus sordidus) is a species of bird in the family Alcedinidae.  It is found in southern New Guinea and in Australia. Its natural habitats are subtropical or tropical moist lowland forests, mangroves, and plantations.  It was formerly considered a subspecies of the collared kingfisher.

Taxonomy
Three subspecies are recognised:

 T. s. sordidus (Gould, 1842) – Aru Islands, southern coasts of New Guinea, and northern and north-eastern coasts of Australia
 T. s. pilbara (Johnstone, 1983) – coastal north-western Australia from the De Grey River to Exmouth Gulf 
 T. s. colcloughi (Mathews, 1916) – coastal east central to southeastern Queensland

References

External links

Photos, audio and video of Torresian kingfisher from Cornell Lab of Ornithology's Macaulay Library

Torresian kingfisher
Birds of New Guinea
Birds of the Northern Territory
Birds of Queensland
Torresian kingfisher